HD 27022, also known as HR 1327, is a star located in the northern circumpolar constellation Camelopardalis. The object has also been designated as 20 H. Camelopardalis, but is not commonly used in modern times. It has an apparent magnitude of 5.27, allowing it to be faintly visible to the naked eye. Based on parallax measurements from Gaia DR3, the star has been estimated to be 347 light years away.

This is a solitary, yellow giant with a stellar classification of G4 III. It has alternatively been classified as G5 IIb wk, indicating a bright giant with weak lines. HD 27022 is currently on the horizontal branch  located on the warm end of the red clump, a region of the said branch filled with metal-rich giant stars. It has 2.88 times the mass of the Sun but at the age of 444 million years, it has expanded to 10.71 times its girth. Like most giants, it spins rather slowly, having a projected rotational velocity of  km/s. Kinematically, it belongs to the halo of the Ursa Major moving group.

References

G-type giants
G-type bright giants
Camelopardalis (constellation)
027022
Durchmusterung objects
1327
020266
Ursa Major Moving Group